Hibolithes is a genus of belemnite that lived from the Middle Jurassic to the Early Cretaceous, and has been found in Antarctica, Greenland, Iran, Europe, South America, and New Zealand. In 2020, this genus was found in the Pedawan Formation (Tithonian – Hauterivian) in Sarawak, on the island of Borneo (Malaysia).

Species and sexual dimorphism 
At least two Hibolithes species, H. conradi and H. semisulcatus, represented in Jurassic (Oxfordian and Tithonian) and possibly Early Cretaceous (Late Berriasian) zones of Hungary.

H. shimanskyi, H. orlovi and H. ivanovi from Upper Callovian-Lower Oxfordian of Bryansk Oblast and Saratov Oblast of European Russia, were described in 1976 by Gustomesov. In 2006, Ippolitov assigned H. shimanskyi as a synonym to H. girardoti due to sexual dimorphism within this species. Ippolitov also assigned H. orlovi and H. ivanovi as synonyms to H. sangensis for the same reason.

References

Further reading 
 Fossils (Smithsonian Handbooks) by David Ward (Page 161)
 Combémorel R. & Mariotti  M. 1986:  Les bélemnites de la carrierede Serra San Quirico (Province d’Ancona, Apennin central, Italie)et la paléobiogéographie des bélemnites de la Téthys méditer-ranéenne au Tithonique inférieur. Géobios 19, 3, 299—321

External links 
 Hibolithes in the Paleobiology Database
 Ippolitov A.P. 2006.  On the  possible  expression  of  sexual dimorphism in Hibolithes Montfort, 1808 from the Middle and Upper Jurassic of European Russia (in Rissian). Russian Acad. Sci., Paleont. Inst., Moscow, 8—10  November 2006. ISBN 5-201-15412-3

Belemnites
Prehistoric cephalopod genera
Jurassic cephalopods
Cretaceous cephalopods
Extinct animals of Antarctica
Mesozoic animals of Europe
Mesozoic animals of South America
Cephalopods of South America
Molluscs of Europe
Fauna of Antarctica
Molluscs of New Zealand